USCGC Richard Snyder (WPC-1127) is the 27th  cutter built for the United States Coast Guard. She is the first of her class to be home-ported in Atlantic Beach, North Carolina.

Design

Like her sister ships, Richard Snyder is designed to perform search and rescue missions, port security, and the interception of smugglers.  She is armed with a remotely controlled, gyrostabilized 25 mm autocannon, four crew served M2 Browning machine guns, and light arms. She is equipped with a stern launching ramp that allows her to launch or retrieve a water-jet propelled high-speed auxiliary boat without first coming to a stop.  Her high-speed boat has over-the-horizon capability, and is useful for inspecting other vessels and deploying boarding parties.  She is designed to support her crew of 24 for missions of up to five days over distances of almost .

Operational history

Richard Snyder was delivered to a Coast Guard base in Key West for her sea trials on February 8, 2018.  She was commissioned on April 20, 2018 at her home port in Atlantic Beach, North Carolina.

It is the 27th in a new generation of Sentinel-class cutters and the first fast-response cutter to be stationed in North Carolina. The patrol boat will be used for search-and-rescues, resource management and other missions.

In June of 2022, Richard Snyder began an extensive drydock period.

Namesake

In 2010, Charles "Skip" W. Bowen, who was then the United States Coast Guard's most senior non-commissioned officer, proposed that all 58 cutters in the Sentinel class should be named after enlisted sailors in the Coast Guard, or one of its precursor services, who were recognized for their heroism.  In 2015 the Coast Guard announced that Richard Snyder, who was awarded a Silver Star for attacking Japanese ground forces during an amphibious assault on the island of Biak, would be the namesake of the 27th cutter.

References 

Sentinel-class cutters
Ships of the United States Coast Guard
2018 ships
Ships built in Lockport, Louisiana